Progress, plans, problems (PPP) is a management technique for recurring (daily, weekly or monthly) status reporting. A person reports 3-5 achievements, goals and challenges from the reporting period. It is used in organizations in situations like employee to manager, team member to team or CEO to board, investors and advisors reporting.

Each report consists of three sections:

 Progress: Employee's accomplishments, finished items and closed tasks for the period ending.
 Plans: Goals and objectives for the next reporting period.
 Problems: Items that are stuck and can't be finished. Problems often need help from someone else, not just the employee.

PPP reporting has been used in companies like Apple and Skype  and startup accelerators like Seedcamp and Antler as their internal reporting process.

References

External links
Progress, Plans, Problems
Printable day Planner

Human resource management
Time management